SC Cambuur, also known as Cambuur Leeuwarden, or simply Cambuur, is a Dutch football club from the city of Leeuwarden formed on 19 June 1964. They currently play in the Eredivisie, the top tier of Dutch football, after winning the 2020–21 Eerste Divisie title. The home ground of the club is the 10,000-capacity Cambuur Stadion. The club usually plays in yellow shirts and blue shorts. The origin of the club's emblem is the coat of arms of the House of Cammingha, a Frisian noble family.

History
Founded in 1964, Cambuur has played a total of seven seasons in the top-flight Eredivisie. In the 1980s and 1990s, the club was a regular contender in the Eerste Divisie playoffs. Cambuur won the Eerste Divisie title in 1992 and gained promotion to the Eredivisie, but was relegated two seasons later in 1994. In 1998, the club was promoted again to the Eredivisie, but again was relegated after just two years in the top-flight in 2000. Troubled times followed which brought the "folk club" close to bankruptcy in 2005. The rebuilding started in 2006 and since 2010, the club has been in a relatively stable financial condition.

In 2009, the club almost won the playoff against Eredivisie side Roda JC, only losing on penalties. In 2010, the club came in second, again just narrowly missing promotion. Cambuur welcomed during these play-offs more than 40,000 spectators in just two weeks. Another estimated 7,000 fans watched the final play-off match against Roda on a large screen in the city centre of the city of Leeuwarden. More than 1.4 million people watched the final play-off match on television, which appeared to be another record for a play-off promotion match in the Netherlands. In total, more than 4.5 million people watched the play-off matches between Cambuur, PEC Zwolle and Roda JC on television that year.

Cambuur won the Eerste Divisie championship in the 2012–13 season, awarding the club promotion to the Eredivisie for the 2013–14 season. On 1 May 2016, Cambuur were relegated to the Eerste Divisie after losing 6–2 away to PSV.

Cambuur were denied promotion to the 2020–21 Eredivisie as a result of the COVID-19 pandemic, despite being in first place of the 2019–20 Eerste Divisie.

Supporters
Cambuur has a group of ultras, known as the M.I.-Side, who stand on the north and south stands at the Cambuur Stadion. The name derives from the street names in which the stands are built: M stands for Marathonstraat and I for Insulindestraat. Most of the hardcore fans of Cambuur are sitting close to the stand of the away fans on the northern side of the stadium. They are among the most notorious in the Netherlands. In the 2009–10 season, the average attendance was 8,600 fans per game, and more than 6,500 season tickets were sold. That was a new record for Cambuur, as these numbers were achieved while the club was in the second division but even higher than when it played in the Eredivisie. In the 2009–10 season, the club sold out six regular season matches with 10,000 fans per game, another milestone for the Leeuwarden-based club. Never before in the second division it had sold out that many regular season matches.

Current squad

Honours
Eerste Divisie
Winners: 1991–92, 2012–13, 2020–21
Runners-up: 1996–97, 1997–98, 2009–10

Tweede Divisie
Winners: 1956–57, 1964–65

Recent history

Below is a table with Cambuur's domestic results since the introduction of professional football in 1956.

Club staff

Managers

  Jan Bens (1 July 1964 – 30 June 1966)
  Piet de Wolf (1966–68)
  Jan Bens (1 July 1968 – 30 June 1970)
  Arie Otten (1 July 1970 – 30 June 1972)
  Leo Beenhakker (1972–75)
  Nol de Ruiter (1 July 1976 – 30 June 1980)
  Henk de Jonge (1980–83)
  Theo Verlangen (1983–85)
  Simon Kistemaker (1 July 1985 – 30 June 1986)
  Fritz Korbach (1 July 1986 – 30 June 1988)
  Sándor Popovics (1 June 1988 – 30 June 1990)
  Rob Baan (1 July 1990 – 30 June 1992)
  Theo de Jong (1 July 1992 – 30 September 1993)
  Fritz Korbach (30 September 1993 – 31 January 1995)
  Han Berger (1 July 1995 – 30 June 1998)
  Gert Kruys (1 July 1998 – 18 May 2002)
  Henny Lee (interim) (19 May 2002 – 30 June 2002)
  Rob McDonald (1 July 2002 – 30 June 2003)
  Dick de Boer (1 July 2003 – 31 December 2004)
  Jan Schulting (31 December 2004 – 30 June 2005)
  Roy Wesseling (1 July 2005 – 19 February 2007)
  Gerrie Schouwenaar (2007)
  Jurrie Koolhof (1 July 2007 – 14 September 2008)
  Stanley Menzo (20 September 2008 – 27 October 2010)
  Alfons Arts (27 October 2010 – 22 March 2013)
  Henk de Jong (interim) (22 March 2013 – 30 June 2013)
  Dwight Lodeweges (1 July 2013 – 1 April 2014)
  Henk de Jong (2 April 2014 – 9 February 2016)
  Marcel Keizer (15 February 2016 – 30 June 2016)
  Rob Maas (30 June 2016 – 15 October 2016)
  Sipke Hulshoff (15 October 2016 – 17 June 2017)
  Marinus Dijkhuizen (1 July 2017 – 28 November 2017)
  Sipke Hulshoff (28 November 2017 – 31 January 2018)
  René Hake (31 January 2018 – 30 June 2019)
  Henk de Jong (1 July 2019 – 20 October 2022)
  Pascal Bosschaart &  Martijn Barto (interim) (20 October 2022 – 14 November 2022)
  Sjors Ultee (14 November 2022  – )

Notable former players

The players below had senior international cap(s) for their respective countries. Players whose name is listed represented their countries while playing for SC Cambuur.
 

Indonesia
 Stefano Lilipaly
Lithuania
 Vytautas Andriuškevičius
Cameroon
 Marc Mboua
Democratic Republic of Congo
 Jody Lukoki
Iran
 Reza Ghoochannejhad
Morocco
 Adnane Tighadouini
Netherlands
 Bert Konterman
 Michael Mols
 Jaap Stam
Netherlands Antilles
 Robin Nelisse
Nigeria
 Bartholomew Ogbeche
Ukraine
 Yevhen Levchenko  
United States
 Gregg Berhalter
Yugoslavia
  Milko Đurovski
Slovakia
 Albert Rusnák
Philippines
 Paul Mulders
Republic of Ireland
 Jack Byrne

See also
 List of football clubs in the Netherlands

References

External links

 Official website
 Cambuur Leeuwarden at weltfussballarchiv.com

 
Sport in Leeuwarden
Football clubs in Friesland
Football clubs in the Netherlands
Association football clubs established in 1964
1964 establishments in the Netherlands